"Don't Go to Strangers" is a song written by Russell Smith and J.D. Martin, and recorded by American country music artist T. Graham Brown.  It was released in January 1987 as the fourth single from the album I Tell It Like It Used to Be.  The song was Brown's second number one on the country chart.  The single went to number one for one week and spent a total of fourteen weeks on the country chart.

Charts

Weekly charts

Year-end charts

References

1987 singles
Songs written by Russell Smith (singer)
1986 songs
T. Graham Brown songs
Capitol Records Nashville singles
Songs written by J. D. Martin (songwriter)